Route  80 is a highway in southeastern Missouri.  Its eastern terminus is at the Mississippi River in Belmont; its western terminus is at U.S. Route 61/U.S. Route 62 midway between Sikeston and New Madrid.  East Prairie is the only other town on the highway.

At Belmont, there used to be a ferry connecting Route 80 to Kentucky Route 80, which is a major east–west thoroughfare across southern Kentucky, continuing into Virginia, as Virginia State Route 80.

Major intersections

References

080
Transportation in New Madrid County, Missouri
Transportation in Mississippi County, Missouri